Anderson Soares de Oliveira or simply Anderson Bamba (born 10 January 1988) is a Brazilian former professional football central defender.

Career

Flamengo
Anderson Oliveira started his career with Clube de Regatas do Flamengo. He excelled in winning the third championship of the junior state championship and the Junior Cup OPG.

Anderson began his career professional in 2006, with Flamengo and was sold to Tombense in January 2008.

Germany

In the summer 2008, German club Bayer Leverkusen secured the transfer rights to Anderson. He played the 2008–09 season for VfL Osnabrück, "on loan" from Bayer Leverkusen despite the fact that he did not have a contract with the Bundesliga club. On 1 July 2009, he agreed to be loaned to Fortuna Düsseldorf for the 2009–10 season.

On 1 April 2010, he signed with Borussia Mönchengladbach and joined his new team on 1 July. After one season in Gladbach, Anderson was loaned to the newly relegated Eintracht Frankfurt.

In April 2017 he agreed the termination of his contract with Eintracht Frankfurt which was due to run out in June 2018

Honours
Flamengo
 Brazilian Cup: 2006
 Campeonato Carioca de Juniores: 2006, 2007
 Taça Otávio Pinto Guimarães: 2006, 2007

References

External links
 
 

1988 births
Living people
People from São Gonçalo, Rio de Janeiro
Association football defenders
Brazilian footballers
CR Flamengo footballers
Tombense Futebol Clube players
VfL Osnabrück players
Bayer 04 Leverkusen players
Bayer 04 Leverkusen II players
Fortuna Düsseldorf players
Borussia Mönchengladbach players
Eintracht Frankfurt players
Bundesliga players
2. Bundesliga players
Brazilian expatriate footballers
Brazilian expatriate sportspeople in Germany
Expatriate footballers in Germany
Sportspeople from Rio de Janeiro (state)